Rudkhaneh (also Romanized as Rūdkhāneh; also known as Darreh Chāleh Mes̄qālī) is a village in Hombarat Rural District, in the Central District of Ardestan County, Isfahan Province, Iran. At the 2006 census, its population was 7, in 4 families.

References 

Populated places in Ardestan County